SYTV or Shenyang Television was launched in 1979. Its programs cover the Shenyang area.

SYTV Channels
 News & Comprehensive Channel
 Economic Channel (co-operate with LRTV)
 Public Channel (co-operate with LRTV)

Former SYTV channels 
 Movie and TV Channel - stopped airing in 2012
 SYTV Shopping Channel - stopped airing in 2012
 Sunshine Shenyang Channel

External links
 Official Site 
 Shenyang Media Network Limited Liability Company 

Television channels and stations established in 1979
Television networks in China
Mass media in Shenyang